Frederick John Hudson (22 November 1878 – 7 October 1966) was an English cricketer.  Hudson was a right-handed batsman whose bowling style is unknown.  He was born at Bottesford, Leicestershire.

Career
Hudson made a single first-class appearance for Leicestershire against Surrey in the 1901 County Championship at The Oval.  Surrey won the toss and elected to bat, making 423 in their first-innings, during which Hudson bowled 15 wicketless overs.  In response, Leicestershire made 224 in their first-innings, with Hudson being dismissed for a duck by Tom Richardson.  Leicestershire were forced to follow-on in their second-innings, this time making an improved 385, although Hudson only contributed a single run before he was bowled by Digby Jephson.  Set 187 to win, Surrey reached 104/4, before the match was declared a draw.  This was his only major appearance for Leicestershire.

Death
He died at the place of his birth on 7 October 1966.

References

External links
Frederick Hudson at ESPNcricinfo
Frederick Hudson at CricketArchive

1878 births
1966 deaths
People from Bottesford, Leicestershire
Cricketers from Leicestershire
English cricketers
Leicestershire cricketers